The Young Socialists of Croatia is the Marxist–Leninist youth organization of the Socialist Labour Party of Croatia (Croatian: Socijalistička radnička partija Hrvatske or SRP).

Program 
The Young Socialists are in favor of abolishing capitalism and establishing workers' self-management and socialism in Croatia and demanding that it leave the European Union and NATO.

The Young Socialists oppose discrimination, understand themselves as feminists and support the pride parade throughout Croatia.

Organisation 
The members of the organisation are between 15 and 35 years of age.

The Young Socialists of Croatia is chaired by a three-member executive committee, elected at the assembly with a term of office of 2 years, and an elected member sits in the SRP presidency.

The motto of the organization is "Never Slaves, Never Masters!"

History 
The Young Socialists of Croatia were founded as the "Young Democratic Left" in 1997.

They changed their name to "Young Socialists of Croatia" in 2001.

They became full members of the World Federation of Democratic Youth in 2019.

Links 
• Socialist Labour Party of Croatia

• League of Communist Youth of Yugoslavia

External links
 http://socijalizam.info/ Internetportal of the Young Socialists
 https://www.facebook.com/Mladi-Socijalisti-179409195436468/ Facebook page of the Young Socialists
 https://www.instagram.com/mladi.socijalisti/ Instagram page of the Young Socialists

Youth wings of political parties in Croatia
Socialist parties in Croatia

ru:Социалистическая рабочая партия Хорватии#«Социалистическая молодежь Хорватии»